Tanjung Sepat may refer to:
 Tanjung Sepat, Pahang in Malaysia
 Tanjung Sepat, Selangor in Malaysia
 Tanjong Sepat (state constituency) of Selangor, Malaysia